John Copley may refer to:

 John Copley (producer) (born 1933), British theatre and opera producer
 John Singleton Copley (1738–1815), American painter
 John Copley, 1st Baron Lyndhurst (1772–1863), British lawyer and politician
 John Copley (artist) (1875–1950), British artist